Chase Icon (born February 22, 2001) is an American singer, songwriter, social media content creator, and reality television personality native to Southern California.

Early life 
The youngest of three sisters, Icon was born into a devout Christian family. Throughout her upbringing, her parents strictly forbade her from engaging with any form of media which they deemed oppositional to their conservative religious values. Early into her adolescence, Icon decided to renounce the teachings of her faith that she found incongruent with her identity and personal desires. Consequently, at the age of 15, she was forced to leave her family home to reside with her eldest sister.

Career 
In June 2013, Icon started to gain a following on the social media platform Twitter after creating an initially anonymous account to participate in online communities dedicated to discussing contemporary pop culture. However, Icon gained popularity in late-2019 when she started uploading comedic impersonations of female celebrities to her profile—most notably, Kylie Jenner and Lady Gaga. The widespread virality of these videos quickly propelled her towards online notoriety among predominantly queer youth on the internet, providing Icon with opportunities to experiment in musicianship.

Following positive reception towards her vocal and creative contributions to the song “Lice” in collaboration with hyperpop artist Kyunchi in June 2020, Icon started on her first extended play scheduled to release the following year. On January 15, 2021, Icon formally commenced her solo career in music with the release of her debut single “SRS” (an acronym for “sex reassignment surgery”) under independent electronic-dance producer, Space Candy. Later that year, after releasing additional promotional singles, Icon released her debut EP, Domination, on September 1 to generally favorable reviews from public audiences. Her latest single, “Like Me,” is scheduled for release on February 9, 2022.

Additionally, in 2020, Icon starred in the British reality-television competition program Slag Wars: The Next Destroyer as the series’ primary narrator.

Personal life 
Icon is a transgender woman. She currently resides in Los Angeles, California.

Discography

Singles

As lead artist

As featured artist

Extended plays

Filmography

Television

References 

2001 births
Living people
Singer-songwriters from California
Transgender women musicians
Singers from Los Angeles
British game show hosts
American LGBT singers
American women in electronic music
Transgender singers